Star Wars: The High Republic is a multimedia project consisting of various stories from the Star Wars franchise set during the "High Republic" era, which spans 350 to 50 years before the Skywalker Saga and is set hundreds of years after the fall of the "Old Republic". The initiating event of the sub-franchise is "The Great Disaster" involving the antagonistic "space Vikings" known as the Nihil and the subsequent intervention of the Jedi. 

The series is divided into three phases. The first, Light of the Jedi, ran from 2021 to 2022; the second phase, Quest of the Jedi, started in 2022; and the third phase, Trials of the Jedi, will start at a later date.

History
"Project Luminous" was started in September 2018 with invitations to Star Wars authors including Claudia Gray, Justina Ireland, Daniel José Older, Cavan Scott, and Charles Soule to Skywalker Ranch, with Lucasfilm offering them a "blank slate" in determining the project. Lucasfilm had teased "Project Luminous" in April 2019, prompting intense fan speculation.

On February 24, 2020, Lucasfilm announced a new series of comics and novels called Star Wars: The High Republic, intended to be a publisher-only multimedia project, unrelated to any films in development. A trailer was released showing events taking place two centuries before the events of Star Wars: Episode I – The Phantom Menace. It shows the Jedi at the height of their power and rise of the Nihil.

The series was originally intended to debut with the Light of the Jedi novel in August 2020, a few days before Star Wars Celebration 2020, but was delayed due to the COVID-19 pandemic until January 2021. The first chapter of the novel was released in June 2020 through IGN. In November 2020, the second chapter of the novel was released on StarWars.com, followed by the next six through the Penguin Random House website. In December 2020, Disney released a free digital sampler of early chapters of the first phase of High Republic books and comics, revealing the main characters for each series.

On Disney Investor Day 2020, it was revealed that Leslye Headland's The Acolyte series for Disney+ would take place during the late High Republic era. Shortly after, Tencent began releasing Star Wars: The Vow of Silver Dawn, an e-book created specifically for Chinese audiences in collaboration with Lucasfilm. The Vow of Silver Dawn also takes place near the end of the High Republic era, said to be approximately 50 years prior to The Phantom Menace. Lucasfilm has stated that they currently have no plans for an English translation and release.

On January 4, 2021, a day prior to the release of the first novels, Lucasfilm hosted a launch event where they gave more information regarding the works released following the first batch of novels and comics. This included the fact that Star Wars Insider would have monthly short stories as part of the publishing initiative, written by Scott and Ireland, several newly announced books releasing in the Summer of 2021, and that the first phase of The High Republic would last into 2022. The second phase was given the name Quest of the Jedi, and the third Trials of the Jedi.

Works

Phase I — Light of the Jedi

Short stories
 "Go Together" (December 15, 2020 – February 10, 2021), a two-part story written by Charles Soule, and published in Star Wars Insider #199 and #200 from Titan Magazines. The first part acts as a prologue to Soule's novel Light of the Jedi, and the second part as an epilogue.
 "First Duty" (March 17, 2021 — April 27, 2021), a two-part story written by Cavan Scott, and published in Star Wars Insider #201 and #202. The story features the character Velko, the first aid to the head of Starlight Beacon, meant to act as a view into the High Republic outside of the Jedi.
 "Hidden Danger" (June 8, 2021 – August 10, 2021), a two-part story written by Justina Ireland, and published in Star Wars Insider #203 and #204. The story features the Agrarian and Agricultural Alliance meeting at Starlight Beacon ahead of the upcoming Republic Fair, before being attacked by the Drengir.
 "Past Mistakes" (September 21, 2021 – November 2, 2021), a two-part story written by Cavan Scott, and published in Star Wars Insider #205 and #206.
 "Shadows Remain" (December 14, 2021 – January 25, 2022), a two-part story written by Justina Ireland, and published in Star Wars Insider #207 and #208.

Novels
 Star Wars: The High Republic – Light of the Jedi (January 5, 2021) by Charles Soule, published by Del Rey. The novel features the Great Disaster, the inciting incident of the event, when a ship was destroyed while in hyperspace, resulting in pieces of it threatening to destroy an entire system.
 Star Wars: The High Republic – The Rising Storm (June 29, 2021) by Cavan Scott, published by Del Rey. The novel features the Republic Fair, a gathering to celebrate the great things and new inventions of the Republic, and involves the Jedi Stellan Gios as well as a monster hunter named Ty Yorrick.
Star Wars: The High Republic - The Fallen Star (January 4, 2022) by Claudia Gray, published by Del Rey. In this book, the Nihil deal a costly blow to both The Jedi and The Republic by executing a plan to sabotage Starlight Beacon itself.

Young adult novels
 Star Wars: The High Republic - Into the Dark (February 2, 2021) by Claudia Gray, published by Disney–Lucasfilm Press. The novel features Padawan Reath Silas, whose ship is knocked out of hyperspace, forcing him and several other Jedi to take refuge on an abandonded space station overrun with plant life.
 Star Wars: The High Republic – Out of the Shadows (July 27, 2021) by Justina Ireland, published by Disney–Lucasfilm Press. It continues the story of Vernestra Rwoh from A Test of Courage and Reath Silas from Into the Dark.
Star Wars: The High Republic – Midnight Horizon (February 1, 2022) by Daniel José Older, published by Disney–Lucasfilm Press.

Middle-grade novels
 Star Wars: The High Republic – A Test of Courage  (January 5, 2021) by Justina Ireland, published by Disney–Lucasfilm Press. The novel shows young Jedi Vernestra Rwoh and Imri Cantaros, as well as several children, aboard a ship bombed by the Nihil, forcing them to survive on a hostile jungle moon.
 Star Wars: The High Republic – Race to Crashpoint Tower (June 29, 2021) by Daniel José Older, published by Disney–Lucasfilm Press. Taking place at the same time as The Rising Storm, it features Padawans Ram Jomaram, a gifted mechanic from a small planet getting his first glimpse at the larger galaxy through the Republic Fair, and Lula Talisola from The High Republic Adventures.
Star Wars: The High Republic – Mission to Disaster (2022) by Justina Ireland, published by Disney–Lucasfilm Press.

Young reader books
 Star Wars: The High Republic – The Great Jedi Rescue (January 5, 2021) by Cavan Scott, published by Disney–Lucasfilm Press. It serves as a young reader adaptation of Light of the Jedi by Charles Soule.
 Star Wars: The High Republic – Showdown at the Fair (October 5, 2021) by George Mann, published by Disney–Lucasfilm Press. It serves as a young reader adaptation of The Rising Storm by Cavan Scott.

Comics
 Star Wars: The High Republic, an ongoing comic book by Cavan Scott with art by Ario Anindito, published by Marvel Comics. The series premiered on January 6, 2021, beginning with the 5-issue arc "There is No Fear", taking place directly after the novel Light of the Jedi and featuring young Padawan Keeve Trennis. A second story arc began with the sixth issue of the series on June 2, 2021.
 Star Wars: The High Republic Adventures, an ongoing comic book by Daniel José Older with art by Harvey Tolibao, published by IDW Comics. It features the character Yoda, on sabbatical from the Jedi Council, mentoring a group of young Padawans. The first arc started on February 3, 2021 and ran for five issues, and the second began with the sixth issue on July 7, 2021. 
 Star Wars: The High Republic – The Edge of Balance, an original manga by Justina Ireland and Shima Shinya with art by Mizuki Sakakibara, published by Viz Media. It focuses on Jedi posted on smaller planets, emphasizing on their role as a protector of the people, and features Jedi Lily Tora-Asi and Arkoff, as well as Stellan Gios, who appears in several stories in the event, combating the attacking Drengir. The first volume was released on September 7, 2021.
 Star Wars: The High Republic Adventures — The Monster of Temple Peak, a four-issue comic book series by Cavan Scott with art by Rachel Stott, published by IDW. The series expands on Ty Yorrick, a character introduced in The Rising Storm, and debuted in August 2021. The Monster of Temple Peak was originally announced as a graphic novel, before being reformatted into a limited series.
 Star Wars: The High Republic – Trail of Shadows, a comic book mini-series by Daniel José Older with art by David Wachter, published by Marvel Comics. The series follows the events of The Rising Storm, and features Jedi Emerick Caphtor on a mission from the Jedi Order and private detective Sian Holt on a mission from Chancellor Lina Soh, both investigating "shocking events at the Republic Fair".

Reference Books 

 The Art of Star Wars: The High Republic (Phase One)  (October 18, 2022) by Kristin Baver, published by Abrams Books.
 Star Wars: The High Republic: An Illustrated Archive  (November 29, 2022) by Cole Horton, published by Insight Editions.

Audio
 Star Wars: The High Republic – Tempest Runner (August 31, 2021), an audio drama by Cavan Scott, published by Penguin Random House Audio. The story focuses on the character of Lourna Dee from Light of the Jedi, one of the three "Tempest Runners" who hold the second highest position of power in the Nihil.

Web series
 Characters of Star Wars: The High Republic, a series of animated shorts that tells the stories of The High Republic'''s heroes and villains. The first short, highlighting A Test of Courage character Vernestra Rwoh, released on January 19, 2021, on the official Star Wars YouTube channel and website.
 Star Wars: The High Republic Show, a behind-the-scenes web series hosted by Krystina Arielle on the official Star Wars YouTube channel and website. The series releases on a bi-monthly basis, and features guests from the initiative discussing the works and what went into making them. The first episode premiered on January 27, 2021.

Phase II — Quest of the Jedi
Short stories
Novels
 Star Wars: The High Republic – Convergence (November 22, 2022) by Zoraida Córdova, published by Del Rey.
 Star Wars: The High Republic – Cataclysm (April 4, 2023) by Lydia Kang, published by Del Rey.

Young adult novels
 Star Wars: The High Republic - Path of Deceit (October 4, 2022) by Tessa Gratton and Justina Ireland, published by Disney–Lucasfilm Press.
 Star Wars: The High Republic - Path of Vengeance (May 2, 2023) by Cavan Scott, published by Disney–Lucasfilm Press.
At New York Comic Con 2022 it was announced that nine unique authors would produce a High Republic YA Anthology. The novel will include every previous High Republic author.

Middle-grade novels
 Star Wars: The High Republic – Quest for the Hidden City  (November 1, 2022) by George Mann, published by Disney–Lucasfilm Press.
 Star Wars: The High Republic – Quest for Planet X  (April 4, 2023) by Tessa Gratton, published by Disney–Lucasfilm Press.
Young reader books

Comics

 Star Wars: The High Republic, an ongoing comic book by Cavan Scott with art by Ario Anindito, published by Marvel Comics. It will premier in October 2022.
 Star Wars: The High Republic – The Blade, a comic book by Charles Soule with art by Marco Castiello, published by Marvel Comics. It will premier in November 2022.

Audio

 Star Wars: The High Republic – The Battle of Jedha (February 14th, 2023), an audio drama by George Mann, published by Penguin Random House Audio.

Related works
 Temple of Darkness, an expansion for the virtual reality game Star Wars: Tales from the Galaxy's Edge that takes place during the High Republic, developed by ILMxLab. The game features Jedi Padawan Ady Sun’Zee, the sole survivor of an encounter with an evil relic on Batuu, who works with Yoda to confront it.
 Star Wars: The Vow of Silver Dawn, a Chinese language eBook written by an author by the pen name "His Majesty the King". The Vow of Silver Dawn was created in collaboration between Lucasfilm and Tencent in an effort to create an interest in Star Wars among a Chinese audience, and was released chapter-by-chapter. The eBook takes place near the end of the High Republic era, 50 years before The Phantom Menace, and features a young Jedi named Sean with a secret past, patrolling the Outer Rim. Lucasfilm has stated there are no plans for an English translation and release.
 Star Wars: Young Jedi Adventures, an upcoming animated series for Disney+ and Disney Junior that follows a group of younglings as they learn to become Jedi Knights during the High Republic era. It is the first full-length animated Star Wars series targeted at young audiences.
 Star Wars: The Acolyte, an upcoming Disney+ original series written by Leslye Headland, who also acts as showrunner. In April 2020, Variety reported that a female-centric live-action Star Wars streaming television series was in development for Disney+ with Russian Doll co-creator Leslye Headland serving as a writer and showrunner. In early November, Headland expounded that the series would be set "in a pocket of the universe and a pocket of the timeline that we don't know much about," elaborating that she was more engaged creatively with the geography of the Star Wars universe than its existing visuals. On November 5, Deadline reported that the series was expected to be an "action thriller with martial arts elements". On Disney Investor Day 2020, it was revealed that the series is "mystery-thriller" featuring "emerging dark side powers in the final days of the High Republic era."
 The video game Star Wars Eclipse, revealed in December 2021, will be set in the High Republic era. It is in development by Quantic Dream.

Reception
In the first week of its release, the event's debut novel Light of the Jedi was the #2 best selling novel on Amazon, and #1 on  The New York Times Best Seller list of hardcover fiction, staying on the list for four weeks. A Test of Courage, which released on the same day, debuted at #2 on The New York Times list for children's middle grade hardcover books, staying on the list for two weeks. The third novel, Into the Dark, gained similar success by debuting on #1 on the list for young adult hardcover novels.

The first two issues of Marvel's The High Republic comic book series were the best-selling digital comics on Comixology during the week of their release. The first issue sold over 200,000 physical pre-orders to comic book shops, prompting Marvel to create a second printing of the issue before its official release, as well as third and fourth printings shortly after.

References

External links
 Star Wars'' (Lucasfilm): 

Works based on Star Wars
Works postponed due to the COVID-19 pandemic
Prequel novels
Prequel comics